The Congressional Muslim Staff Association (CMSA) is a non-partisan, bicameral organization that strives to improve the institution of Congress by serving Muslim staffers on Capitol Hill and create a pipeline for young Muslims who aspire to serve their country.

 

Political advocacy groups in the United States
Religious activism
Islamic organizations based in the United States
Islamic political organizations